Juan Mónaco was the defending champion, but lost to John Isner in the semifinals.
Isner went on to win the title, defeating Nicolás Almagro in the final, 6–3, 7–5.

Seeds
The top four seeds received a bye into the second round.

Draw

Finals

Top half

Bottom half

Qualifying

Seeds
The top five seeds receive a bye into the second round.

Qualifiers

Lucky losers
  Ivo Karlović

Draw

First qualifier

Second qualifier

Third qualifier

Fourth qualifier

References
Main Draw
Qualifying Draw

Singles
2013 - Singles